Arotrophora gilligani is a species of moth of the family Tortricidae. It is found in Taiwan.

The wingspan is about 16 mm. The ground colour of forewings is pale brownish cream with a ferruginous shade submedially. The costa and posterior half of the wing are suffused brownish. The hindwings are pale brownish grey.

Etymology
The species is named for Todd Gilligan.

References

Moths described in 2009
Arotrophora
Moths of Taiwan